Simmie is a rural locality in the Maranoa Region, Queensland, Australia.

History 
The locality takes its name from the parish, which in turn was likely named after pastoralist George Simmie, one of the lessees of Injune pastoral run in 1866.

Road infrastructure
The Carnarvon Highway runs through from south to north.

References 

Maranoa Region
Localities in Queensland